Yeşilçay Drinking Water Plant is a plant used to supply drinking water to İstanbul, Turkey.

İstanbul 
The total population of İstanbul is 13 483 052 (as of 2011) which makes İstanbul one of the most populous cities of the world. The rate of annual increase is about  3.45% and the water demand is increasing  asymptotically. So one of the most important problems of the municipality is to meet the demand.

Yeşilçay 
The headwaters are on the mountainous area of the Kocaeli Peninsula and the river flows to Black Sea in Ağva.

The plant 
There are two water regulators (Sungurlu and İsabey ) on the rivulet and the water is pumped to the purification plant at Emirli via  mains pipe. In the first stage of the project 145 000 000 m3 water has been given to service annually. In the second stage the annual water intake is increased to a total of 335 000 000 m3.

List of 50 projects 
Turkish Chamber of Civil Engineers lists Yeşilçay Drinking Water Plant as one of the fifty civil engineering feats in Turkey, a list of remarkable engineering projects realized in the first 50 years of the chamber.

References 

Buildings and structures in Istanbul Province
Water supply and sanitation in Turkey
Şile